PT Bumi Laut Shipping Corp or Bumi Laut Group is one of the oldest shipping companies in Indonesia. The Bumi Laut Group is headquartered in Jakarta, with offices throughout Indonesia. It controls a range of wholly owned businesses, including shipping, logistics, transportation, infrastructure, agriculture and resource based industries as well as financial advisory and investments.

History
The Bumi Laut Group opened its first office in 1922 in the Port of Belawan Deli, North Sumatera, Indonesia, which was at one time the biggest natural commodity exporting port in Indonesia.

The group's businesses
The Bumi Laut Group is primarily involved in the Shipping and Logistics oriented businesses, among others:

• Ship owning and operating; • International Shipping Agencies (Marketing and Sales, Ship Handling, Port Operations and Terminal Services); • Ship management (Crew Agency and Management, Marine, Nautical and Technical Services); • Chartering & Tramping Operations (Spot Shipping Business); • Logistics (Freight Forwarding, Inland Transportation, Warehousing and Depot Facilities and other Supporting Services); • Project Cargo, General Bulk Cargoes and Energy Transportation (Contract, Parcel and Regular Liner Business); • Inter-island Feeder Service/Commercial Shipping Line; • Marine and Offshore Services; • Infrastructure (Port, Jetty, Stockpile) and Transportation of Coal and other Bulk Cargoes; • Shipbroking.

The group's diversified businesses
The Bumi Laut Group is involved in other diversified activities, such as:

 International Airline Agencies
 Tours and Travel
 General Contracting and Trading of Coal, Tin, Copra, Cashew Nuts and other Natural Resources
 Sole Distributors and Agents for Royal Selangor products and Coomyns Sterling Silvers
 Financial Advisory (Mergers and Acquisitions, Public Private Partnerships and IPO Advisory)
 Private Equity Investments
 Venture Capital Investments

List of key executives

 Arya Johan Singgih (second generation), Chairman
 Jaka Aryadipa Singgih (third generation), CEO and managing director

Ownership
The Bumi Laut Group is now in its fourth generation of business owners.

Conglomerate companies of Indonesia
Shipping companies of Indonesia
Container shipping companies
Reefer shipping companies
Shipbroking companies
Tanker shipping companies
Companies based in Jakarta
Transport companies established in 1922
1922 establishments in the Dutch East Indies
Indonesian brands
Privately held companies of Indonesia